KYVA may refer to:

 KYVA (AM), a radio station (1230 AM) licensed to Gallup, New Mexico, United States
 KYVA-FM, a radio station (103.7 FM) licensed to Grants, New Mexico, United States